In the 1999 Rugby World Cup qualifying process, European teams played for six places in the final tournament. Three more places were available in the repechage. France and Wales were automatic qualifiers.

Round A

Pool 1
Ukraine qualify for Round B.

Pool 2
Croatia qualify for Round B.

Pool 3
Andorra qualify for Round B.

Round B

Pool 1
Italy and Georgia qualify for Round C.

Pool 2
Romania and Netherlands qualify for Round C.

Pool 3
Spain and Portugal qualify for Round C.

Round C

Pool 1
Ireland and Romania qualify for RWC 1999, Georgia goes forward to Repechage.

Pool 2
England and Italy qualify for RWC 1999, Netherlands goes forward to Repechage.

Pool 3
Scotland and Spain qualify for RWC 1999, Portugal goes forward to Repechage.

Bibliography

1999
European
1997–98 in European rugby union
1998–99 in European rugby union